Shamsabad (also Romanized as Shamsābād) is a village in Qaleh Now Rural District, Qaleh Now District, Ray County, Tehran Province, Iran. At the 2006 census, its population was 29, in 12 families.

References 

Populated places in Ray County, Iran